Schlat is a municipality in the district of Göppingen in Baden-Württemberg, Germany.

History
Schlat changed owners several times during the Middle Ages. Barbara von Schlat, a local noblewoman, sold a third of the town in 1410 to Adelberg Abbey, which already controlled nearby properties donated to it by the County of Württemberg. As a result of the Protestant Reformation in the Holy Roman Empire, Adelberg Abbey was secularized and its holdings seized by the Duchy of Württemberg, which purchased the Liebenstein's portion of Schlat in 1789. The Oberamt was reorganized as a Landkreis in 1938 and Schlat remained in its jurisdiction. The town grew after World War II to its east and south.

Geography
The municipality (Gemeinde) of Schlat is located at the center of the district of Göppingen, in the German state of Baden-Württemberg. Elevation above sea level in the municipal area ranges from a high of  Normalnull (NN) at the top of the Wasserberg to a low of  NN.

Politics
Schlat has one borough (Ortsteil) and three villages: Fuchseckhof, Rommental, and Ursenwang. There are also two abandoned villages, Dollenkirchen and Zillenhart, in the municipal area.

Coat of arms
Schlat's coat of arms displays a sheep, in red, grazing below the branch of an apple tree, in green with four leaves and one red apple, upon a field of yellow. The images on the municipal on the blazon refer to Schlat's history of agriculture, especially husbandry. The coat of arms was awarded along with a municipal flag by the Federal Ministry of the Interior on 30 June 1959.

Transportation
Schlat is connected to Germany's network of roadways by Bundesstraße 10.

References

External links

  (in German)

Towns in Baden-Württemberg
Göppingen (district)